The St. Louis Soccer League was based in St. Louis, Missouri and existed from 1915 to 1938. At its founding, it was the only fully professional soccer league in the United States. The league was founded from two teams from the St. Louis Soccer Football League and two teams from the Federal Park Soccer League.

History
Two professional soccer organizations, the St. Louis Soccer Football League and the Federal Park Soccer League battled for dominance in St. Louis during the 1913–14 and 1914–15 seasons. Negotiations to end the warring between the leagues went on throughout the 1914–15 season until a plan was finalized near the end of March 1915. The plan called for the top two teams of the St. Louis Soccer Football league, Innisfails and Columbus Club, to be admitted to the U.S.F.A. and those teams to join the top two teams in the Federal Park League, St. Leo's and Ben Millers, to form a new, stronger organization, the St. Louis Soccer League. Winton E. Barker, president of the Federal Park League, was unanimously elected president of the league.

In 1916, the newly established U.S. Football Association assembled a team of U.S. players for a Scandinavia.  These games became the first in the history of the national team.  Of the players on the U.S. roster, only Matt Diedrichsen from Innisfails was selected from outside the north east U.S.

The entry of the United States into World War I drained all four teams by drafting players into the military, with St. Leo’s affected the most.

In 1926, the SLSL briefly expanded to include Chicago Sparta, but the team did not complete the season, withdrawing on November 11, 1926.  In 1935, the SLSL began a period of instability which led to its eventual dissolution four years later.

In 1939, the league expanded to include teams from Chicago and Cleveland.  Teams from these two cities and St. Louis had competed against each other from time to time, but this year, the SLSL decided to formalize the competition, which was called the “Inter-city Soccer Loop”.  The league, which had experienced considerable internal strife including lawsuits between teams over player tampering had finally collapsed.  The St. Louis Municipal League, which ran the lower St. Louis city divisions, became the only league.  As such its top division became the de facto St. Louis first division until the creation of the St. Louis Major Soccer League in 1948.

National competition
Before the establishment of the National Challenge Cup in 1914, most teams participated in city, state or regional competitions.  The only opportunity for teams from one region to test themselves against the best on a national level came from ad hoc cups and off-season tours.

In 1913, the St. Louis Soccer League came to national attention when St. Leo’s tied the Paterson True Blues, winners of the American Cup.  At the time, the American Cup was the most recognized regional cup and was the de facto East Coast championship.

While the newly established United States Football Association established the National Challenge Cup in 1914, it was not until 1918 that the St. Louis teams entered the cup. They initially had difficulty getting past the Chicago and Cleveland teams, but in 1920 Ben Millers stunned the east coast teams by knocking off Fore River to become the first club outside of the northeast to win the cup.  SLSL teams then went to the next four finals, taking only the 1922 title.  SLSL team also went to the final in 1926, 1929 and every season from 1932 to 1939.

Past winners

Teams
When the St. Louis Soccer League was established, St. Louis boasted many of other leagues. In 1913, the St. Louis Municipal League consolidated many of these disparate leagues into a multi-division organization which sat below the SLSL. Finally, St. Louis soccer teams depended on sponsorship.  When sponsorship changed, the teams changed their names as well.

Original four teams
 Ben Millers 1915–16 through 1923–24
→ Raticans/Pants Store Co. 1924–25
→ Pants Store Co. 1925–26
→ Raticans 1926–27
→ Tabler F.C. 1927–28 through 1930–31
→ Anderson 1931–32 through 1933-34
→ Marres 1934–35 through 1935-36
→ Town Crier 1936–37
→ St. Matthew's 1937–38
 Innisfails 1915–16 through 1920–21
→ De Andreis 1921–22
→ Barrett-Hoover 1922–23 through 1923–24
→ Ben Millers 1924–25 through 1935–36
 Missouri Naval Reserves 1915–16 through 1917–18
→ Scullin Steel Co. 1918–19 through 1924–25
→ Wellston F.C. 1925–26 through 1928–29
→ Hellrung & Grimm 1929–30 through 1930–31
→ Stix, Baer & Fuller 1931–32 through 1933–34
→ Central Brewers 1934–35
→ Democratic Country Club/St. Louis 1935–36
 St. Leo's 1915–16 through 1917–18
→ St. Louis Screw Co. 1918–19 through 1921–22
→ Vesper-Buick 1922–23 through 1925–26
→ White Banner Malts 1926–27
→ Morgan Haulers 1927–28
→ Madison Kennel Club 1928–29 through 1929–30
→ Coca-Cola 1930–31 through 1932–33
→ Minit-Rub Stars 1933–34
→ Hellrung & Grimm 1934–35 through 1935–36
→ Club Lotus 1936–37

Later teams
 Spanish Sport Club/Burke's Undertakers 1935–36
→ Burke's Undertakers 1936–37 through 1938–39
 German Sport Club 1935–36
 Herrmann Undertakers 1935–36
 Schumacher Undertakers 1935–36
 Eddie Hart's/North Side Optimist Club 1936–37
 St. Patrick's 1937–38
→ Lindell Trust Co. 1938–39
 South Side S.C. 1937–38

Notes

See also
 Soccer in St. Louis

References

External links
 Annual league standings
 History of Soccer in St. Louis

 
Soccer in St. Louis
Defunct soccer leagues in the United States